Perathoner is a surname. Notable people with the surname include:

Alan Perathoner (born 1976), Italian former alpine skier
Christa Perathoner (born 1987), Italian biathlete
Emanuel Perathoner (born 1986), Italian snowboarder
Julius Perathoner (1849–1926), Austro-Hungarian-born Italian politician 
Werner Perathoner (born 1967), Italian former alpine skier